Alessandra Dianne Ampuria (16 September 1994 – 11 September 2020) was a Malaysian singer-songwriter. She began writing music when she was 14 and came to prominence in the TV3 reality television show Mentor Legend. Dianne was one of 12 participants in the third series of the Astro Ria programme Big Stage.

Early life
She was born Alessandra Dianne Ampuria on 16 September 1994, in Tuaran, Sabah, Malaysia. She was the daughter of Ampuria Jasthy and Nur Syakinah Abdullah and had four siblings, a brother and two stepbrothers. Dianne was brought up a Muslim, and was a cousin of the actress . She briefly worked as a craftsman at an engineering company in Kuala Lumpur before she decided to leave the job to focus on her music career. She began to write music when she was 14 years of age and she did not have formal education in this field.

Music career
When she was 20 years old in 2014, she took part in the TV3 reality television programme , and was eliminated in the first week of the contest. Dianne's debut single, "", was released in June 2015 and received radio airplay in Malaysia and was charted on multiple radio lists. She received the Red Box Award as the song "Hey! Kau" was one of the 10 most popular songs in Malaysia during 2016. That same year, Dianne performed the song on Muzik Muzik, although she failed to qualify for the music competition Anugerah Juara Lagu.

In April 2016, Dianne was one of the successful singers at the 25th Annual Harian Metro Tour Concert in Miri, Sarawak for her first appearance at the concert. That same year, her second single, "Ku Tak Mahu Cinta", was released. She released the ballad single Aku dan Kekasih in July 2017 so that she could challenge herself because ballads required more expression of emotion than pop songs. The single was accompanied by a music video in which Dianne was depicted as a zombie after the publisher and recording companies wanted to portray the singer as unhealthy as a consequence of problems with stress following the end of a relationship. Dianne's song failed to chart highly in Malaysia. The following year, Dianne joined fellow singers Mell Ahmad and Lii in the special Dona group project.

Dianne made an appearance on the TV3 telefilm Dari Jauh in 2019. The following year, she was one of 12 contestants of the third series of the Astro Ria programme . Dianne switched to running a salted fish business so that she could receive another source of income during the COVID-19 pandemic in Malaysia. The singles  and Sandra that she recorded were released after her death.

Death
On the afternoon of 5 September 2020, Dianne lost control of the Haval H1 car she was driving in with her cousin on the North–South Expressway Central Link close to Subang Jaya as a result of brake issues and crashed into the left-hand side of an Nissan Almera ahead of her. She died as a consequence of her injuries at approximately 1 am five days later in the Intensive Care Unit of Putrajaya Hospital. Her remains was returned to Sabah and she was buried at Kampung Kauluan Islamic Cemetery, Tuaran. A prayer ceremony was held for her at the Tuanku Mizan Zainal Abidin Mosque, Putrajaya on 16 September.

References

External links
 

1994 births
2020 deaths
Sabah musicians
Malaysian Muslims
20th-century Malaysian women
Kadazan-Dusun people
21st-century Malaysian women
Malaysian women pop singers
Malaysian women singer-songwriters
Malay-language singers
Malaysian rhythm and blues singers
Ballad musicians
Road incident deaths in Malaysia